Bebe may also refer to:

Rafael García Aguilera (born 1990), Spanish futsal player commonly known as Bebe
Euclides Gomes Vaz (born 1983), Portuguese futsal player commonly known as Bebé